James Albert Myers (October 22, 1863 – December 24, 1927), was a Major League Baseball second baseman from -. Known as "Cod" Myers, he owned the Health Office Saloon and built an apartment house in Terre Haute, Indiana. Myers's daughter, Ernestine Myers, pursued a successful career in professional dance. He played for the Milwaukee Brewers, Philadelphia Quakers/Phillies, Kansas City Cowboys, and Washington Nationals.

External links

Baseball almanac page on Myers

1863 births
1927 deaths
Major League Baseball infielders
Baseball players from Illinois
Milwaukee Brewers (UA) players
Philadelphia Quakers players
Kansas City Cowboys (NL) players
Washington Nationals (1886–1889) players
Philadelphia Phillies players
19th-century baseball players
Muskegon (minor league baseball) players
Winona Clippers players
People from Danville, Illinois